The 1987 Penn Quakers football team represented the University of Pennsylvania in the 1987 NCAA Division I-AA football season.

Schedule

References

Penn
Penn Quakers football seasons
College football undefeated seasons
Penn Quakers football